Arthur Patrick Aloysius Ross (21 January 1872 – date of death unknown) was an Irish first-class cricketer.

Ross made two appearances in first-class cricket for Dublin University in 1895. Both of his appearances came against Cambridge University, with the first fixture being played at Cambridge, and the second at Dublin. He scored a total of 22 runs across his two matches, with a highest score of 11. His date of death is unknown.

References

External links

1872 births
Cricketers from Dublin (city)
Irish cricketers
Dublin University cricketers
Year of death missing